The CRM 114 Discriminator is a fictional piece of radio equipment in Stanley Kubrick's film Dr. Strangelove (1964), the destruction of which prevents the crew of a B-52 from receiving the recall code that would stop them from dropping their hydrogen bombs on the Soviet Union. The device is one of several that malfunction in the film, along with Mandrake's telephone call attempts, the bomb doors failing to open and the Doomsday Weapon's misuse, a common theme in Kubrick's work of the failure of human planning.

The code became a running joke, in Kubrick's work and outside. Kubrick used a near homophone of "CRM 114", "Serum 114", for the name of a drug injected into Alex to help his reformation in A Clockwork Orange (1971). In the movie Eyes Wide Shut (1999), the morgue Bill visits is stationed in the hospital's corridor C, Room 114 (CRM 114).

Real-life parallels 
In Peter George's novel, Red Alert (1958), which was the basis for the film, the device is called the CRM 114. George was well-informed; under the U.S. military Joint Electronics Type Designation System (The "AN" System), CRM is the designator for an air-transportable cargo (C) radio (R) maintenance or test assembly (M) and 114 is a feasible series number. If the CRM 114 were an actual U.S. military item, its official number would be designated as AN/CRM-114.

To ensure the enemy cannot plant false transmissions and fake orders, the CRM 114 is to be switched into the receiver circuit prior to receiving attack or attack cancellation orders. The three code letters of the period are to be set on the alphabet dials of the CRM 114, which will then block any transmissions other than those preceded by the set letters from being fed into the receiver.

Kubrick corresponded with George in 1963, while preparing the film, to make sure that the failure of the CRM 114 device could credibly interfere with the recall of an aircraft. George, who talked with a contact in the military, wrote, "Based on his and another expert's opinions, I am of the opinion that there is in fact no practical way of demonstrating inability to recall the bombers other than by the introduction of a device such as the CRM 114."

Prior to the introduction of addressed digital communications, some real-world analog communications systems performed a function very similar to the fictional CRM 114. Some aircraft radios used SELCAL (selective calling), which muted the receiver unless an assigned tone was received. Ground mobile radios used a similar system called CTCSS (Continuous Tone-Coded Squelch System).

Other uses 
Other non-Kubrick works contain references to "CRM 114", in apparent homage to Kubrick:
 An amplifier in Dr. Emmett Brown's laboratory in Back to the Future (1985) is labeled "CRM-114."
 In the 1996 film Executive Decision, fighter pilots receive their orders to shoot down a hijacked Boeing 747-200 over the "CRM-115" device.
 In the Star Trek: Deep Space Nine episode "Business as Usual" (1997), "CRM-114" is a power hand weapon produced by the Breen, one that is "effective against moving vehicles and surface emplacements" and featuring a "quick recharge time."
 The 2005 remake of Fun with Dick and Jane includes a financial transaction form number "CRM-114".
 In the film Severance (2006), a black comedy involving a weapons manufacturer team-building trip to Eastern Europe, a reference is made to their CRM-114 anti-personnel land mine that is apparently doing quite well.
 In the game HorrorClix (2006), the unit called "Carnage Bot" is also known by the code "CRM114", confirmed by game designer Seth Johnson to be a Kubrick reference.
 On the TV show Heroes, "CRM 114" is the catalog code assigned to the Kensei sword that Hiro is searching for in the episode "Parasite" (2007).  (In the Heroes 360 experience during the episode, it was confirmed that the reference was intentional.) Malcolm McDowell, the star of A Clockwork Orange, also guest starred in this episode, as the current owner of the sword.
 "CRM114" is also the name of a 2005 computer program which uses a statistical approach for classifying data and is especially utilized for filtering email spam.
 In Men In Black 3 (2012), *CRM-114 is the ID for the bunker on the beach as well as a lunar prison block earlier in the movie.
 CRM-114 and CRM-115 are the names of medicinal drugs in Jon S. Baird's 2013 film Filth, based on Irvine Welsh's novel. In the director's commentary, Baird states this is a tribute to Kubrick as his favorite director, who always used CRM-114.
 CRM-114 is also the name of the Archipelago Homeowners Association law quoted in "No Robots Allowed", the 46th episode of the first series of the Sonic Boom TV series.
 In the 2018 film Welcome to Marwen a pair of miniature Purple Heart medals for sale are catalogued as "CRM-114".

See also 
 THX 1138
 A113
 List of filmmaker's signatures

References

Fictional elements introduced in 1964
Fictional objects
Radio technology
Stanley Kubrick